Daviess County may refer to:

Daviess County Courthouse (Indiana), Washington, Indiana
Daviess County Courthouse (Missouri), Gallatin, Missouri